Georgi Nikolov Glouchkov (alternate spelling: Gueorgui) (born January 10, 1960, in Tryavna) is a Bulgarian former professional basketball player and president of Bulgarian Basketball Federation.  A 6 ft 8 in (204 cm) forward, he was the first player from an Eastern bloc country to compete in the American National Basketball Association (NBA).

Professional career
Glouchkov began playing with Bulgaria's national team as a teenager. After one successful season with the Luskov Yambol junior side, he got promoted to their senior side by his junior coach Simeon Varchev. They also worked together in BC Balkan Botevgrad and Akademik Varna. By the mid-1980s, he had established a reputation as one of Europe's top five players.  After averaging 23 points and 19 rebounds during the 1984-85 season in which his team Akademik Varna won the national championship, he attracted the attention of the Phoenix Suns, who selected him in the seventh round (148th pick overall) of the 1985 NBA Draft.  The Suns signed him to much fanfare on September 25, 1985, releasing a special press kit which included a history of Bulgaria and a glossary of Bulgarian phrases.

Glouchkov knew very little English and was accompanied by Bozhidar Takev, a Bulgarian coach and trainer who translated for him.  At the beginning of the season, Glouchkov impressed the Suns with his strong rebounding and became a regular member of the team's playing rotation; as the year went on, however, Glouchkov began gaining weight, and his productivity decreased.  Some Suns' staff members attributed his weight gain to his taste for American fast food and candy, but rumors also surfaced that he was experimenting with steroids.  He ended the 1985-86 NBA season with averages of 4.9 points and 3.3 rebounds per game.

As the season came to a close, Glouchkov began losing weight at a dramatic pace.  When he reported to the Suns' 1986 summer league team, he weighed 25 pounds less than he had weighed when he first signed with the Suns.  The Suns never determined the cause of his weight fluctuations, but after a poor performance in summer league competition, the Suns advised him to return to Europe.

Glouchkov did return to his homeland and continued to play basketball in the European leagues. He had his most post-NBA success with the Italian club Phonola Caserta, whom he led to the European Winner's Cup finals in 1989 before losing to Real Madrid. Glouchkov was a FIBA Balkans Selection in 1991.

National team career
Glouchkov began playing with the junior national teams of Bulgaria at the age of seventeen. He began playing with the senior men's Bulgarian national team at the age of 19.

He participated in 4 EuroBaskets. He played at the EuroBasket 1979, the EuroBasket 1985, the EuroBasket 1989, and the EuroBasket 1991.

References

External links
FIBA Profile
FIBA Europe Profile

Georgi Glouchkov Player Info  at NBA.com
ACB.com Profile 
LegaBasket.it profile 

1960 births
Living people
BC Yambol players
Bulgarian expatriate sportspeople in Spain
Bulgarian expatriate sportspeople in the United States
Bulgarian men's basketball players
Centers (basketball)
Bulgarian expatriate basketball people in the United States
Italian men's basketball players
Italian people of Bulgarian descent
Liga ACB players
Mens Sana Basket players
Pallacanestro Reggiana players
People from Tryavna
Phoenix Suns draft picks
Phoenix Suns players
Power forwards (basketball)
Saski Baskonia players